Warren Township is the name of several townships in the U.S. state of Iowa:

 Warren Township, Bremer County, Iowa
 Warren Township, Keokuk County, Iowa
 Warren Township, Lucas County, Iowa
 Warren Township, Poweshiek County, Iowa
 Warren Township, Story County, Iowa
 Warren Township, Wayne County, Iowa

See also 
 Warren Township (disambiguation)

Iowa township disambiguation pages